Tracy Lavon "Ace" Sanders (born November 11, 1991) is a former American football wide receiver. He was drafted by the Jacksonville Jaguars in the fourth round of the 2013 NFL Draft. He played college football at South Carolina.

Early years
Sanders was born in Palmetto, Florida. He played high school football for Manatee High School in Bradenton. He is the son of former Florida State Seminoles safety Tracy Sanders.

In addition to football, Sanders also ran track and field. He placed second in the 100 meters at the 2010 FHSAA 3A District 11 Championships, setting a career-best time of 10.98 seconds. He also competed in the long jump, he had a career-best jump of 6.95 meters.

College career
Sanders received an athletic scholarship to attend the University of South Carolina, where he played for coach Steve Spurrier's South Carolina Gamecocks football team from 2010 to 2012. As a junior in 2012, he was a first-team All-Southeastern Conference (SEC) selection as a kick returner, and was named SEC Special Teams Player of the Year. In the 2013 Outback Bowl against the Michigan Wolverines, he caught a career-best nine passes for 92 yards and two touchdowns, scored on a 63-yard punt return, and was named the game's most valuable player (MVP).

Professional career

The Jacksonville Jaguars chose Sanders in the fourth round, with the 101st overall pick, of the 2013 NFL Draft. He registered his first career reception in Week 1 against the Kansas City Chiefs. His first career punt return came in Week 4 against the Indianapolis Colts.

On December 5, 2013, in a Thursday Night Football game against the Houston Texans, Sanders threw a 21-yard touchdown pass to running back Jordan Todman on a trick screen play. The Jaguars went on to win the game, 27–20. On December 15, he scored his first touchdown reception against the Buffalo Bills.

Sanders finished his rookie season with 484 receiving yards on 51 catches with one touchdown, one pass for 21 yards and a touchdown, three kick returns for 140 yards, 25 for 140 yards on punt returns (with 16 fair catches) all in 15 out of the 16 regular season games.

Sanders's second season got off to a bad start as Sanders was suspended for the first four games of the 2014 season for violating the NFL's substance abuse policy. He was re-activated on October 4, 2014, ahead of the Jaguars' Week 5 matchup against the Pittsburgh Steelers. Overall, he had six receptions for 55 yards in the 2014 season.

On July 17, 2015, Sanders was waived by the Jaguars.

References

External links
 Jacksonville Jaguars bio
 South Carolina Gamecocks bio

1991 births
Living people
American football return specialists
American football wide receivers
Jacksonville Jaguars players
South Carolina Gamecocks football players
Sportspeople from Bradenton, Florida
Players of American football from Florida
People from Palmetto, Florida